SS Nicholas Biddle was a Liberty ship built in the United States during World War II. She was named after Nicholas Biddle, an American financier who served as the third and last president of the Second Bank of the United States. He also served in the Pennsylvania General Assembly. He is best known for his role in the Bank War.

Construction
Nicholas Biddle was laid down on 11 August 1942, under a Maritime Commission (MARCOM) contract, MCE hull 917, by the Bethlehem-Fairfield Shipyard, Baltimore, Maryland; she was sponsored by Mrs. R.E. Anderson, the wife of MARCOM's director of finance, and was launched on 22 September 1942.

History
She was allocated to Seas Shipping Co., Inc., on 30 September 1942. On 15 December 1948, she was laid up in the National Defense Reserve Fleet, Beaumont, Texas. On 15 March 1962, she was sold for scrapping to Commercial Metals Co., for $52,444.44. She was removed from the fleet on 3 April 1962.

References

Bibliography

 
 
 
 

 

Liberty ships
Ships built in Baltimore
1942 ships
Beaumont Reserve Fleet